Beta Hi Chahiye is an Indian drama television series which premiered on BIG Magic on 20 May 2013. The series stars Ankit Bathla and Garima Tiwari in the main lead and is the first daily soap opera launched on BIG Magic by Reliance Entertainment. The story focuses on social issues associated with pressure for a wife to produce male offspring.

Overview
The story centers around the life of a girl Saroja who faces many trials and tribulations from her in-laws after giving a birth to a girl child.

Cast

 Syed Ayna ... Kanchan ( saroja's sister)
Garima Tiwari ... Saroja (main female protagonist)
Ankit Bathla ... Madhav (Saroja's husband)
 Jitendra Trehan as Girjapati
 Shravani Goswami as Kalavati
Vipin Chahal... Vijender
 Aparna Ghoshal as Phooleshwari
[Sonali Gupta] as Tara
[Manish]...Sangram
[Nikhil]...Balli
Nisha Verma...Manju
 Keerti Nagpure as Priyanka

References

Indian drama television series
Big Magic original programming
2013 Indian television series debuts